The Fajã do Pedregalo, is a permanent debris field, built from the collapsing cliffs on the northern coast of the civil parish of Rosais, in the municipality of Velas, island of São Jorge, in the Portuguese archipelago of the Azores.

Located near Fajã de Fernando Afonso it is accessible from a small trail, where transport is difficult.

Although it has never been inhabited, the fajã is used to raise livestock and cultivate some crops, including specifically potato. This region is also popular with artesnal/local fishermen.

References

See also
 List of fajãs in the Azores

São Jorge Island
Faja Pedregalo
Pedregalo